This article is the discography of American classical crossover singer Jackie Evancho and includes all the studio albums, live albums, EPs and charted singles, as well as the peak chart positions, for the United States (Billboard 200, Billboards Classical Albums and Classical Digital Songs), Canada, Ireland, Japan, Mexico, New Zealand and United Kingdom. It also shows the relevant certifications from RIAA and Music Canada, and related sales figures.

Evancho has released nine studio albums and an EP, in addition to singles and music videos. Six of Evancho's studio albums and her EP have charted on the Billboard 200, four of them in the top 15, and nearly three dozen of her songs have charted on the US Classical Digital Songs chart. Between November 2010 and October 2012, Evancho sold an estimated 2.1 million albums domestically. By 2015, she had sold over 3 million albums. She has also released three live albums, all produced by PBS, based on three of her studio albums.

Evancho's eighth studio album, The Debut (2019), was her eighth consecutive No. 1 release on Billboards Classical Albums Chart.

Chart performance analysis
Evancho, at age 10, was the youngest solo artist ever to debut in the top 10 on the Billboard 200, and the youngest solo artist ever to go platinum in the US. As of June 2015, Evancho had sold a total of more than 3 million albums.

Billboard ranked Evancho's first major-label recording, O Holy Night, which debuted at No. 2 on the Billboard 200, as the top Classical Album of 2011 (their year ran from December 2010 through November 2011). It ranked her next two albums, Dream with Me and Heavenly Christmas (which debuted, respectively, at No. 2 and No. 11 on the Billboard 200) at No. 2 and No. 4, respectively, on its Classical Albums chart for the year 2011. For the year 2011, it ranked O Holy Night as the No. 15 best-selling album, Dream with Me as the No. 45 album, and Heavenly Christmas as the No. 105 album. It ranked the first two as the No. 4 and No. 10 Internet Albums of the year, respectively.  It also ranked O Holy Night as the No. 31 Canadian Album of 2011. Dream with Me spent 30 consecutive weeks on the Billboard 200 and spent 74 consecutive weeks on the Billboard Classical Albums chart. Dream with Me peaked at No. 4 on the aCharts World Albums Top 40 chart.

Billboard ranked Evancho as the No. 10 Billboard 200 Artist of 2011, the No. 1 Classical Albums Artist, and the No. 3 Internet Albums Artist of that year. The No. 7 debut of Songs from the Silver Screen on the Billboard 200, in 2012, made the 12-year-old Evancho the second artist who ever "amassed three top 10 albums [on the Billboard 200] at such a young age." On its year-end Classical Albums chart for 2012, Billboard ranked Heavenly Christmas No. 2, Dream with Me No. 5 and Songs from the Silver Screen No. 7. Evancho ranked as the No. 37 Billboard 200 artist of 2012 and the No. 2 Classical Albums Artist of that year. Heavenly Christmas also ranked No. 41 on the year-end Canadian Albums chart for 2012. Billboard ranked Evancho the No. 5 Classical Albums Artist of 2013, even though she did not release any new albums during the year. Her 2012 album Songs from the Silver Screen was the No. 4 Classical Album of 2013 and appeared on the Billboard Classical Albums chart in 72 weeks.

Awakening debuted at No. 17 on the Billboard 200 chart and No. 1 on the Billboard Classical Albums chart, Evancho's fifth consecutive No. 1 release on that chart. Billboard ranked Awakening as the No. 11 best-selling Classical Album of 2014 (Songs from the Silver Screen was ranked No. 36 for 2014), and Evancho was the No. 7 Classical Albums Artist of 2014. Awakening was ranked on the Billboard 200 for a total of nine weeks and remained on the Billboard Classical Albums chart for a consecutive 72 weeks. Evancho was the No. 4 Classical Albums Artist of 2015, as Awakening was the No. 3 best-selling classical album of 2015. Someday at Christmas peaked at No. 1 on the Billboard Classical Albums chart, her sixth consecutive album to do so. Evancho was the No. 12 Classical Albums Artist of 2016 as Someday at Christmas was the No. 27 best-selling classical album of 2016, and Awakening was the No. 31 best-selling classical album of 2016. Two Hearts and The Debut each debuted at No 1 on Billboards Classical Albums Chart, her seventh and eighth consecutive No. 1 albums on that chart.

Studio albums

Live albums
Dream With Me In Concert, filmed at the Ringling Museum of Art in Sarasota, Florida in April 2011 and broadcast repeatedly as a PBS Great Performances special. It topped the Billboard "Top Music Video" chart in the US in two of its first four weeks, and Billboard ranked it as the No. 21 music video DVD of 2011. It charted in Mexico at No. 75 and in Japan at No. 294. Billboard ranked Dream With Me In Concert as the No. 16 music video album of 2012, and it remained on the Billboard.biz Top Music Video chart for 64 weeks.

Jackie Evancho: Music of the Movies was filmed in June 2012 at the Orpheum Theatre in Los Angeles. It features the same selections as Songs from the Silver Screen. Like Evancho's first live album, this video was also broadcast as a Great Performances special, by PBS stations, beginning on August 11, 2012. The DVD accompanied the Songs from the Silver Screen CD release by Target stores.

Evancho's third PBS special, Awakening: Live in Concert, was filmed in August 2014 at Longwood Gardens in Pennsylvania. It began airing on PBS stations on November 29, 2014; Cheyenne Jackson co-hosts and sings "Say Something" as a duet with Evancho. The special includes all of the songs from Awakening, plus "Say Something" and "O mio babbino caro". A DVD, initially available as a PBS pledge gift, additionally includes "My Immortal". It later became available at most distributors. In its first week of release, it charted at No. 3 on the Billboard Music Video Sales chart and remained on that chart for eight weeks.

EPs

Singles

§ On January 20, 2017, Evancho released Together We Stand, a disc containing three songs: "The Star-Spangled Banner", "America the Beautiful" and "God Bless America". The songs charted at No. 2, 4 and 5, respectively, on Billboard's Classical Digital Song sales chart.

Videos and other collaborations
In addition to the videos of her live albums, Evancho has released videos of songs, including "Silent Night", from her album O Holy Night, and three songs from Heavenly Christmas. Idolator readers chose one of these, "Believe", as their "Favorite Christmas Song" for 2011. The video of Believe charted at No. 1 on the Yahoo Video chart for the week of January 7, 2012. Evancho released videos of two singles of songs from Awakening: "The Rains of Castamere" from the TV series Game of Thrones and "Think of Me" from The Phantom of the Opera. In 2014, she released a video of a pop song, "Go Time", in collaboration with Justice Girls Clothing. In 2015, she released videos of her singles "All of the Stars" and "Safe & Sound". In 2016, she released videos for her singles "Writing's on the Wall", "Coming Home, Pt. II" and "Apocalypse", an original pop song by Peter Zizzo In 2017, Evancho released a video of "Attesa" from her album Two Hearts. From her independent album The Debut, she released videos of the show tunes "Burn" and "I'm Not That Girl". From her 2022 album Carousel of Time, she released videos of Joni Mitchell's "River" and "Both Sides Now".

Official videos

"Silent Night" (2010)
"I'll Be Home for Christmas" (2011)
"The First Noel" (2011)
"Believe" (2011)
"The Rains of Castamere" (2014)
"Go Time" for Justice Girls Clothing (2014)
"Think of Me" (2014)
"All of the Stars" (2015)
"Safe & Sound" (2015)
"Writing's on the Wall" (2016)

"Coming Home, Pt. II" (2016)
"Apocalypse" (2016)
"Pedestal" (2017)
"Attesa" (2017)
"Burn" (2019)
"I'm Not That Girl" (2019)
"River" (2020)
"Both Sides Now" (2022)

Evancho has been included on albums of other artists, including Tony Bennett ("When You Wish Upon a Star", 2011), David Foster ("Pie Jesu", 2011), Vittorio Grigolo ("O Holy Night", 2013), Jumaane Smith ("La Vie en Rose", 2014), Peter Hollens ("Hallelujah", 2014) and Plácido Domingo ("Pie Jesu", 2015).

References

External links
"Pie Jesu", with David Foster, 2011
"Angel", Dream with Me in Concert PBS special, 2011
"Nessun Dorma", Dream with Me in Concert PBS special, 2011
"Pure Imagination", Songs from the Silver Screen, 2012
"Ave Maria" (Vavilov), Awakening PBS special, 2014
"Say Something", with Cheyenne Jackson, Awakening PBS special, 2014
"Hallelujah", with Peter Hollens, 2014

Discographies of American artists